Christian Graf von Forbach, then Christian Marquis de Deux-Ponts and later Christian Freiherr von Zweibrücken (20 November 1752 – 25 October 1817) was an officer of the French Army and later a general of the Royal Prussian and then of the Bavarian Army, at last in the rank of General der Infanterie. He may not be confused with his nephew Christian Freiherr von Zweibrücken (aka Christian Graf von Forbach, 1782–1859), who was a Bavarian General of Cavalry (General der Kavallerie).

Early life and ancestry 
Christian von Zweibrücken, was the first of six children of Christian IV Herzog von Pfalz-Zweibrücken and Maria Johanna Camasse, Gräfin von Forbach (1734-1807). He was born in Zweibrücken. The children, were unable to succeed to their father's Duchy due to the morganatic nature of their parents' marriage at first, but were allowed to wear the name Freiherr von Zweibrücken in 1792.

Biography 
Due to a former business agreement from March 1751 between Louis XV of France and his father, who promised to the French king to raise a battalion of infantry for France when and if needed, the Infantry Regiment "Royal Deux-Ponts" (raised on 19, 1757) of two battalions to the French crown after the outbreak of the Seven Years' War, when it was at first deployed in the Battle of Rossbach. The commander of the regiment at this time was Christian von Forbach, and his brother Philippe Guillaume (later renamed to Wilhelm) was deputy commander. As part of De Rochambeau's expedition corps he led the "Royal Deux-Ponts" during the American Revolutionary War, where the regiment proved in the Battle of Yorktown, also called the "German Battle", on October 4, 1781. In 1783 he married Adélaïde-Françoise de Béthune-Pologne (1761–1823). The couple had three daughters. The first of them Maria Amalia Charlotte Auguste died in her year of birth 1784. The others were Maria Amalia Charlotte Franziska Auguste Eleonore (1786–1839) and Kasimira Maria Louise Antoinette (1787–1846).

Because of the French Revolution, he left the French forces in the rank of a Colonel, meanwhile titled Freiherr von Zweibrücken, and was taken over by the Prussian Army in the rank of a Major General, where he took part in the campaigns against France during 1794 and 1797.

In the end of the century he was taken over on his request by the Bavarian Army, where he became Lieutenant General and provincial commander of the Palatinate region. In spring of 1800 he became commander of a division, merged from the brigades of Von Deroy and von Wrede, and fought under the Austrian Feldzeugmeister Kray and under Archduke John of Austria against France for the British crown.

In 1808 he became Geheimer Rat, and in January 1811 he was promoted to the rank of General der Infanterie. Obviously Von Zweibrücken had also plans to replace von Montgelas by his son-in-law Graf Karl Ernst von Gravenreuth (1771–1826), who was married to his daughter Kasimira. He died in Munich, where he and his brother Wilhelm are buried in the Old Southern Cemetery.

In the European Rose Garden in Zweibrücken a memorial remembers him and his brother.

Awards 
 Cincinnati Order
 Order of the Red Eagle (6 June 1796)
 Kurpfalz-Bavarian Military Honour Award ( Militär-Ehrenzeichen) (24 March 1801, predecessor of the Military Order of Max Joseph)
 Grand Cross of the Military Order of Max Joseph (1 March 1806)

References and notes 

1752 births
1817 deaths
People from Zweibrücken
Counts Palatine of Zweibrücken
Major generals of Prussia
Bavarian generals
French Army officers
House of Wittelsbach
French military personnel of the American Revolutionary War
Grand Crosses of the Military Order of Max Joseph
German commanders of the Napoleonic Wars
Sons of monarchs
Military personnel from Rhineland-Palatinate